The Abierto Mexicano de Raquetas is a squash tournament held in Toluca, Mexico. It is part of the PSA World Tour and the WSA World Tour. The event was established in 2012

Past results

Men's

Women's

External links
Official website

Squash tournaments in Mexico